Acts 1 is the first chapter of the Acts of the Apostles in the New Testament of the Christian Bible. The book containing this chapter is anonymous but early Christian tradition affirmed that Luke composed this book as well as the Gospel of Luke. This chapter functions as a transition from the "former account" (that is, Gospel of Luke) with a narrative prelude (verses 1–5), repeated record of the ascension of Jesus Christ with more detail (verses 6–11) and the meeting of Jesus' followers (verses 12-26), until before Pentecost.

Text

The original text was written in Koine Greek and is divided into 26 verses.

Textual witnesses
Some early manuscripts containing the text of this chapter are:
 Codex Vaticanus (AD 325–350)
 Codex Sinaiticus (330–360)
 Codex Bezae (~400)
 Codex Alexandrinus (400–440)
 Codex Ephraemi Rescriptus (~450; extant verses 3–26)
 Papyrus 56 (5th/6th century)
 Codex Laudianus (~550)

Old Testament references
 : Psalm ; Psalm 109:8

New Testament references
Acts 1:1-3: Luke 1:1-4

Locations

This chapter mentions the following places:
 Bethany
 Jerusalem
 Judea
 Mount of Olives
 Samaria

Introduction (1:1–5)
The beginning of the book follows a conventional opening statement containing the name of the addressee, Theophilus, and a brief reminder of the content of the "former account" (Gospel of Luke) by the same author.

Verses 1–3
The former account I made, O Theophilus, of all that Jesus began both to do and teach, until the day in which He was taken up, after He through the Holy Spirit had given commandments to the apostles whom He had chosen, to whom He also presented Himself alive after His suffering by many infallible proofs, being seen by them during forty days and speaking of the things pertaining to the kingdom of God.

"first book"): refers to Gospel of Luke.
 "Theophilus" (written in Greek in vocative word form): the intended reader of this book, as well as the previous one (Luke 1:3), might be a "patron" who is already informed about "things which have been fulfilled among us", but still needs "assurance" to "know the certainty of those things" (Luke 1:1-4).

Ascension of Jesus (1:6–12)

This section records that forty days after the  resurrection, Jesus commands the disciples during a meal to await the coming of the Holy Spirit, then a cloud takes him upward from sight, and two men in white appear to tell them (the disciples) that he will return "in the same way you have seen him go into heaven."

Verse 8

[Jesus says:] "But you shall receive power when the Holy Spirit has come upon you; and you shall be witnesses to Me in Jerusalem, and in all Judea and Samaria, and to the end of the earth."
Before Jesus left, he charged the disciples with the task of acting as 'witnesses' to him, in the locations that can be read as a 'geographical program' for the whole book of Acts:
 The first 7 chapters set in Jerusalem
 Chapter 8—11 record the spread of the gospel to the surrounding areas within Syria-Palestine ('Judea and Samaria')
 Chapter 13 onwards following Paul's mission ever farther places.

Luke chapter 24 tells how Jesus leads the eleven disciples "as far as" Bethany, a village on the Mount of Olives, where he instructs them to remain in Jerusalem until the coming of the Holy Spirit: "And it came to pass, while he blessed them, he parted from them, and was carried up into heaven. And they worshiped him, and returned to Jerusalem with great joy".

The Gospel of John has three references to ascension in Jesus' own words: "No one has ascended into heaven but he who descended from heaven, the son of man"; "What if you (the disciples) were to see the son of man ascending where he was before?"; and to Mary Magdalene after his resurrection, "Do not hold me, for I not yet ascended to my father...". Various epistles (1 Timothy 3:16, and ) also refer to an ascension in relation to the post-resurrection "exaltation" of Jesus to the right hand of God. Gospel of Mark contains the brief ascension account, but it is considered by a broad consensus among scholars to be a later addition to the original version of that gospel.

Verse 12

Then the apostles returned to Jerusalem from the hill called the Mount of Olives, a Sabbath day’s walk from the city.
"A Sabbath day's walk": 2000 cubits (= 5 furlongs), about 5/8 mile or about 1 kilometer, showing a proximity to Jerusalem (fulfilling Jesus' command in ), as well as portraying the disciples as faithful Jews (cf. ).

Election of Matthias (1:13–26)
As the disciples waited obediently in the upper room in Jerusalem for the promised coming of the Holy Spirit, they devoted themselves "with one accord" in prayer (verse 14), underlying the unity of the group which surprisingly now includes Jesus' mother, brothers, and some women.

 Andrew was moved down from the second place to the fourth place after John
 Thomas was moved up from the eighth place to the sixth place following Philip
 Judas Iscariot is no longer listed.
The omission of Judas Iscariot motivates the narrative of his final fate and Peter's call to find his replacement. The process begins by Peter's appeal to the Scripture (verse 20), and the requirements for the candidate (verses 21–22). With this, Peter reinforces the identity of the group and exerts his de facto authority in the group.

Verse 14 
These all continued with one accord in prayer and supplication, with the women and Mary the mother of Jesus, and with His brothers.
"Mary the mother of Jesus": was mentioned by name for the first time in Luke-Acts since the infancy narrative in Luke 2. 
"Brothers": or "brothers and sisters", translated from the plural Greek word adelphoi, which, depending on the context in New Testament usage, may refer either to "brothers" or to "brothers and sisters" (also verse 1:15 in some versions).

Verse 15 
In those days Peter stood up among the disciples (the number of people together was about a hundred and twenty), and said,
"Stood up": from Greek: : adding a participle to a finite verb ("to stand") to indicate the posture or position of a speaker is a characteristic of Luke as this word is found in the Gospel of Luke 17 times, and in Acts 19 times, only twice in Matthew, six or seven times in Mark.

Verses 21–22 
[Peter says:] "Therefore, of these men who have accompanied us all the time that the Lord Jesus went in and out among us, beginning ('arxamenos') from the baptism of John to that day when He was taken up from us, one of these must become a witness ('martyra') with us of His resurrection."

 "Went in and out": is a "Semitism or Septuagintalism" expression (cf. ), comparable to the English phrase "comings and goings".
 "Beginning" (Greek:): The "baptism" of John" to "that day when He was taken up from us" (ascension) mark the scope for the story of Jesus, with an emphasis on "His resurrection". In Acts 10, Luke notes Peter preaching the gospel using "precisely the same parameters"  also using  arxamenos ("began")  with the claim of being a witness (accusative Greek: , ; plural: martyres) specifically to the resurrection (Acts 10:36-42).
 [Peter preaches to Cornelius and his household:] "The word which God sent to the children of Israel, preaching peace through Jesus Christ—He is Lord of all— that word you know, which was proclaimed throughout all Judea, and began ('arxamenos') from Galilee after the baptism which John preached: how God anointed Jesus of Nazareth with the Holy Spirit and with power, who went about doing good and healing all who were oppressed by the devil, for God was with Him. And we are witnesses ('martyres') of all things which He did both in the land of the Jews and in Jerusalem, whom they killed by hanging on a tree. Him God raised up on the third day, and showed Him openly, not to all the people, but to witnesses chosen before by God, even to us who ate and drank with Him after He arose from the dead. And He commanded us to preach to the people, and to testify that it is He who was ordained by God to be Judge of the living and the dead. To Him all the prophets witness that, through His name, whoever believes in Him will receive remission of sins."

The apostles proceed by asking God as the only resource to 'indicate' his choice through the casting of lots (verse 26), which is a familiar mean to ascertain divine purpose in both the Graeco-Roman world and the Bible, to get Matthias "numbered with the eleven apostles" (verse 26).

Verse 26 
 And they cast their lots, and the lot fell on Matthias. And he was numbered with the eleven apostles.
"Matthias": only mentioned in this chapter in the whole Bible, he was chosen by casting lots to be included as "the Twelve" (replacing Judas Iscariot) from then on.

See also
 Ascension of Jesus
 Bethany
 Church of the Ascension, Jerusalem
 Mount of Olives
 Simon Peter
 Jerusalem
 Judas Iscariot
 Theophilus (biblical)
 Related Bible parts: Psalm 69, Psalm 109, Isaiah 49, Matthew 27, Mark 16, Luke 1, Luke 24, Acts 2

Notes

References

Sources

External links
 King James Bible - Wikisource
English Translation with Parallel Latin Vulgate 
Online Bible at GospelHall.org (ESV, KJV, Darby, American Standard Version, Bible in Basic English)
Multiple bible versions at Bible Gateway (NKJV, NIV, NRSV etc.)

01
Post-resurrection appearances of Jesus
Ascension of Jesus